Avirbhav Verma is an Indian tabla player and percussionist who performs Hindustani classical music. He is the disciple and son of Pawan Kumar Verma, and grandson of Pandit Lachman Singh Seen of Punjab Gharana.

Early life 
Avirbhav was born in Chandigarh, India. He received his first tabla lessons from his father, Pawan Kumar Verma. In 2000, after Verma's death, Avirbhav was taught by his grandfather, Pandit Lachman Singh Seen. His mother, Gandharv Verma, is a vocalist and an artist performing on All-India Radio and Doordarshan. His older brother, Swarit Verma is also a notable tabla player and lives in Melbourne, Australia.

Career 
Avirbhav has accompanied and performed alongside a number of vocalists and instrumentalists, including:
 Pandit Vishwa Mohan Bhatt (Grammy Award Winner) 
 Lt Pandit Mehmood Dholpuri (Harmonium exponent)
 Pandit Ajay Pohankar (Vocalist)
 Pandit Vidyadhar Vyas
 Ustad Salamat Ali Khan
 Pandit Manu Kumar Seen
 Shri Dinesh K Mahavir
 Prof. B. S. Narang
 Ustad Saeed Zafar
 Dhondutai Kulkarni
 Pandit Rajendra Prassanna
 Rishab Prasanna
 Rajesh Prasanna
 Pandit Venkatesh Kumar

He has performed with various French music bands through Alliance Française, including Masaladosa and Erik Truffaz. He has also performed in Auckland, New Zealand, with his brothers Swarit Verma, Basant Madhur, and Deepak Madhur. He joined Delhi Public School, Chandigarh in 2013 as a teacher.

Awards 
He received the State Award by the Government of Punjab which was presented to him by the Punjab Chief Minister, Captain Amrinder Singh.

References

External links 
 

Tabla players
Indian percussionists
1985 births
Living people
21st-century drummers